In Greek mythology, Ilus (Ancient Greek: Ἶλος or Ἴλου Ilos) was a king of Dardania.

Family 
Ilus was the eldest son of Dardanus either by Batea of Troad, daughter of Teucer, or probably Olizone, daughter of Phineus. Ilus was the brother of Erichthonius, his successor. In some accounts, the names of the two sons of Dardanus and Batea were Erichthonius and Zacynthus.

Mythology 
After Dardanus died, his heir Ilus succeeded him to the throne. However, after his long reign, he died childless and heirless. His brother Erichthonius consequently gained the kingship, and became the ancestor of the later Trojans. Homer's Iliad mentions at several points the tomb of Ilus in the middle of the Trojan plain.

Family tree

Notes

References 

 Dictys Cretensis, from The Trojan War. The Chronicles of Dictys of Crete and Dares the Phrygian translated by Richard McIlwaine Frazer, Jr. (1931-). Indiana University Press. 1966. Online version at the Topos Text Project.
 Dionysus of Halicarnassus, Roman Antiquities. English translation by Earnest Cary in the Loeb Classical Library, 7 volumes. Harvard University Press, 1937-1950. Online version at Bill Thayer's Web Site
 Dionysius of Halicarnassus, Antiquitatum Romanarum quae supersunt, Vol I-IV. . Karl Jacoby. In Aedibus B.G. Teubneri. Leipzig. 1885. Greek text available at the Perseus Digital Library.
 Homer, The Iliad with an English Translation by A.T. Murray, Ph.D. in two volumes. Cambridge, MA., Harvard University Press; London, William Heinemann, Ltd. 1924. Online version at the Perseus Digital Library.
 Homer, Homeri Opera in five volumes. Oxford, Oxford University Press. 1920. Greek text available at the Perseus Digital Library.
 Pseudo-Apollodorus, The Library with an English Translation by Sir James George Frazer, F.B.A., F.R.S. in 2 Volumes, Cambridge, MA, Harvard University Press; London, William Heinemann Ltd. 1921. Online version at the Perseus Digital Library. Greek text available from the same website.
Princes in Greek mythology
Mythological kings of Troy
Kings in Greek mythology
Trojans